Jonathan Griffiths  (1773–1839) was an English-born Australian convict, shipowner and builder.

References

1773 births
1839 deaths
Australian ship owners
Australian people in whaling